Kalparanjan Chakma (13 January 1922 – 25 July 2018) was a Bangladesh Awami League politician and a Minister of Chittagong Hill Tracts Affairs. He helped negotiate the release of two Danes and a Briton kidnapped by Shanti Bahini members in Chittagong Hill Tracts.

A tribal leader and a former M.P. from Khagrachari, he died on 25 July 2018 in Dhaka.

References

1922 births
2018 deaths
Chakma people
Bangladeshi Buddhists
People from Khagrachhari District
Awami League politicians
5th Jatiya Sangsad members
7th Jatiya Sangsad members
Ministers of Chittagong Hill Tracts Affairs